Verjee is a surname. Notable people with the surname include:
 Iman Verjee, Kenyan writer
 Rumi Verjee (born 1957), British businessman, philanthropist and peer
 Sabrina Verjee (born 1980/81), British ultramarathon runner
 Zain Verjee (born 1974), Kenyan journalist
 Zainub Verjee (born 1956), Kenyan video artist, curator and writer